Ahmad Fakri bin Saarani (born 8 July 1989) is a former Malaysian professional footballer who plays for Liga M3 side BRM FC and the Malaysia national team. Fakri plays mainly as a right winger but can also play as a forward or as an attacking midfielder.

Fakri has earned 30 caps for the Malaysia national team since making his international debut on 12 August 2009 at the age of 19.

Club career

Perak, Harimau Muda

Fakri was born in Kota Bharu, in the state of Kelantan he has been raised in Batu Gajah, Perak. He started his professional career with Perak when he signed a three-year contract from 2007 until 2009. At the beginning, Fakri is a natural right winger but also can play as a forward. He played for Perak youth team during his season debut.

Fakri was promoted to Perak first team as the senior striker, R. Surendran was away for national duty with the Malaysia national team on a playing tour of Sri Lanka. It was Steve Darby the former Perak coach who brought him into senior team. On 24 March 2007, Fakri made his Liga Super debut for Perak's first team in the 5–1 win against Negeri Sembilan. He scored a hat-trick and made one assist during that match.

On the following season, Fakri signed a one-year contract to play with Harimau Muda in 2007–08 Liga Premier. He made 24 appearances and scored 9 goals for the club.

Perlis, Negeri Sembilan, Felda United
After two seasons playing for Perlis, in December 2010, Fakri signed a contract with Negeri Sembilan. In 2012, Fakri named as the Felda United new player.

Atlético SC
On 8 December 2012, it was confirmed that Fakri had signed a one-year contract with Terceira Divisão side Atlético SC

Kelantan
Fakri had returned to Malaysia and signed with Kelantan after his contract with Portuguese side Atlético SC ended. On 19 April 2013, Fakri scored his first league goal for Kelantan in 1–2 defeat to PKNS. On 31 August 2013, he scored his first Malaysia Cup goal for Kelantan in 1–2 defeat to Negeri Sembilan. Fakri played as a substitute in the 2013 Malaysia Cup final against Pahang.

Kedah
On 1 January 2016, Fakri signed a one-year contract with 2015 Malaysia Premier League champions Kedah. On 14 December 2016, after his loan stint with Felda United ended Fakri returned to Kedah and signed another one-year contract with Kedah.

Felda United (loan)
On 16 July 2016, Fakri was loaned to Felda United on 6-month deal.

Melaka United
On 24 November 2017, Fakri signed a one-year contract with Melaka United.

International career

Youth
Fakri is former Malaysia Under-20 member squad. He has participated in ASEAN Football Federation Youth Championship 2006 and ASEAN Football Federation Youth Championship 2007. He also play in 2007 Hassanal Bolkiah Trophy. In 2008, Fakri was seconded to Harimau Muda, a Malaysian Premier League team made up of members of the Malaysian Under-20 national side.

Senior
Fakri made his senior debut in 0–0 draw against Kenya on 12 August 2009 coming off from the bench. In November 2010, Malaysia coach, K. Rajagobal called up Fakri for the 2010 AFF Suzuki Cup, but he was later ruled up by injury during the 2010 Asian Games. He was later replaced by Ashari Samsudin.

He was selected by Malaysia coach, K. Rajagobal for 2012 AFF Suzuki Cup campaign. However, he only came in as a substitute in Group B match against Indonesia.

Personal life
Fakri has a younger sister, Nur Haniza Saarani playing for the Malaysia women's football team.

Statistics

Club

International

International goals
As of match played 9 November 2017. Malaysia score listed first, score column indicates score after each Fakri goal.

Honours

Club
Perak President Cup
 Malaysia President Cup: 2006–07

Kelantan
 Malaysia FA Cup: 2013; Runner-up 2015
 Malaysia Cup: Runner-up 2013

Kedah
 Malaysia Cup: 2016
 Malaysia Charity Shield : 2017
 Malaysian FA Cup: 2017

International
Malaysia U-23
 2009 SEA Games: Gold
 2011 SEA Games: Gold

References

External links
 Ahmad Fakri Saarani at SoccerPunter.com
 
 

1989 births
Living people
People from Kedah
Malaysian people of Malay descent
Malaysian footballers
People from Kota Bharu
Perlis FA players
Perak F.C. players
Negeri Sembilan FA players
Felda United F.C. players
Atlético S.C. players
Malaysia international footballers
Malaysian expatriate footballers
Expatriate footballers in Portugal
Malaysian expatriate sportspeople in Portugal
People from Kelantan
Footballers at the 2010 Asian Games
Southeast Asian Games gold medalists for Malaysia
Southeast Asian Games medalists in football
Association football wingers
Association football forwards
Competitors at the 2009 Southeast Asian Games
Competitors at the 2011 Southeast Asian Games
Asian Games competitors for Malaysia
21st-century Malaysian people